Resapamea stipata, known generally as the four-lined borer moth or the four-lined cordgrass borer, is a species of cutworm or dart moth in the family Noctuidae.

The MONA or Hodges number for Resapamea stipata is 9393.

References

Further reading

 
 
 

Noctuinae
Articles created by Qbugbot
Moths described in 1875